Simon Sheppard may refer to:

 Simon Sheppard (writer), American writer of gay erotica
 Simon Sheppard (activist) (born 1957), British far-right activist
 Simon Sheppard (footballer) (born 1973), former goalkeeper

See also
 Simon Shepherd (born 1956), British actor